William Meux or Mewes (c.1530-89), of Kingston, Isle of Wight, was an English Member of Parliament.

He was a Member (MP) of the Parliament of England for Newtown, Isle of Wight in 1584.

References

1530 births
1589 deaths
16th-century English people
People from the Isle of Wight
People of the Tudor period
Members of the Parliament of England (pre-1707)